The Kasgar  are a Muslim  community, found in the state of Uttar Pradesh in India . After independence of Pakistan in 1947, many Kasgar migrated and resettled in Pakistan. They are now found mainly in Sindh province and have become part of Muhajir community.

History and present circumstances

The Kasgar (from Persian کاسگر meaning goblet-makers) are an occupational group who are makers of the  kas kuza (Persian: کاسه کوزه)  goblets and other earthen pots. They are concentrated in the Awadh region of Uttar Pradesh.  Information regarding the origin of the community is obscure. They are similar to Muslim kumhar in west uttar pradesh.
The Kasgar are an endogamous community, and they practice both parallel and cross cousin marriages.

Among the Kasgar, the caste council known as a panchayat, plays an important role in resolving disputes among the community.  They perceive themselves to be of Shaikh status. The community is split by sectarian affiliation, with some members belonging to the Shia sects, while others are Sunni.

References

Social groups of Pakistan
Shaikh clans
Muslim communities of India
Social groups of Uttar Pradesh
Muslim communities of Uttar Pradesh